Mackereth is a surname. Notable people with the surname include:

Beverly D. Mackereth (born 1958), American politician
Gilbert Mackereth (1892–1962), British army officer and diplomat
Sally Mackereth (born 1966),      British Architect
Betty Mackereth (born 1924) British Secretary to Philip Larkin

Surnames of English origin